Ptelea is a community of the city of Kozani in northern Greece. Located north-east of the city centre, it has a population of 165 (2011).

References

Kozani
Populated places in Kozani (regional unit)